Torgeir Hovden Standal (born 23 July 1990) is a Norwegian jazz guitarist.

Career 
Standall was raised in Ørsta, nearby Ålesund but moved to Oslo in 2011. He soon met with Natalie Sandtorv and they started The Jist, a duo projects where the guitar meets vocals. After two years of collaboration on a series of performances they released the self-titled debut album (2014). The album was recorded in Bergen, and John Hegre known from Jazzkammer, controlled the mixing and mastering.

In 2014 he toured with The Jist and played a gig at Madame Claude, Berlin. In 2015 they was well received at the 2015 Match & Fuse Festival in Warsaw and also gave concerts in Torino. He is also active on local venues with projects like the tribute band Wild Things Run Fast, celebrating the music of Joni Mitchell together with musicians like Siril Malmedal Hauge (vocals), Olav Opsvik (piano), Martin Morland (bass) and Henrik Lødøen (drums).

Discography 
2014: The Jist (Va Fongool)

References

External links 

The Jist @ Experimontag, Madame Claude, Berlin 27/10/14 2 on YouTube

Norwegian jazz guitarists
Norwegian jazz composers
People from Ørsta
1990 births
Living people
Norwegian male guitarists
Male jazz composers
21st-century jazz composers
21st-century Norwegian guitarists
21st-century Norwegian musicians
21st-century Norwegian male musicians